Bančići is an village in the municipalities Ljubinje, Republika Srpska, and Stolac, Bosnia and Herzegovina.

Demographics 
According to the 2013 census, its population was 40, all (39 Serbs and a Croat) living in the Ljubinje part and nil in the Stolac part.

References

Populated places in Stolac
Populated places in Ljubinje
Villages in Republika Srpska